Michael J. Tarr is an American cognitive neuroscientist who currently holds the Kavčić-Moura Professorship in Cognitive and Brain Science. He is a professor at Carnegie-Mellon University, a recipient of the APA Distinguished Scientific Award for an Early Career Contribution to Psychology from the American Psychological Association in 1997, a recipient of the Troland Award from the National Academy of Sciences in 2003, a Guggenheim Fellow in 2007, and an Elected Fellow of the American Association for the Advancement of Science.

Education
Tarr is a 1980 graduate of Taylor Allderdice High School. He earned his B.A at Cornell University in 1984 and his Ph.D. at Massachusetts Institute of Technology.

Research
He is an expert in visual perception and how brain transforms 2D images into high-level percepts.  His work focuses on face, object and scene processing and recognition in both biological and artificial systems. His highest cited paper is Activation of the middle fusiform 'face area' increases with expertise in recognizing novel objects at 1459 times, according to Google Scholar.

Publications
Chang, N., Pyles, J. A., Marcus, A., Gupta, A., Tarr, M.J., & Aminoff, E. M. (2019). BOLD5000, a public fMRI dataset while viewing 5000 visual images. Scientific Data, 6(1), 49.
Tarr, M. J., & Aminoff, E. M. (2016). Can Big Data Help Us Understand Human Vision? In M. Jones (Ed.), Big Data in Cognitive Science. Taylor & Francis: Psychology Press. 
Aminoff, E. M., Toneva, M., Shrivastava, A., Chen, X., Misra, I., Gupta, A., & Tarr, M. J. (2015). Applying artificial vision models to human scene understanding. Front. Comput. Neurosci., 9.
Leeds, D. D., Pyles, J. A., & Tarr, M. J. (2014). Exploration of complex visual feature spaces for object perception. Front. Comput. Neurosci., 8(106).
Yang, Y., Tarr, M. J., & Kass, R. E. (2014). Estimating learning effects: A short-time Fourier transform regression model for MEG source localization. In Springer Lecture Notes on Artificial Intelligence: MLINI 2014: Machine learning and interpretation in neuroimaging.
Leeds, D. D., Seibert, D. A., Pyles, J. A., & Tarr, M. J. (2013). Comparing visual representations across human fMRI and computational vision. J. of Vision. 13(13).

References

Year of birth missing (living people)
Living people
Fellows of the American Association for the Advancement of Science
Carnegie Mellon University faculty
Cornell University alumni
21st-century American psychologists